Gianni Danzi (January 25, 1940 – October 2, 2007) was an Italian Catholic Archbishop of the Territorial Prelature of Loreto. He was born in Viggiù, Varese province, Italy. Danzi died in October 2007 at the age of 67 at his parents' house in Barasso after a long fight with cancer.

Gianni Danzi was born in Viggiù on 25 January 1940. He was ordained a priest of Lugano, Switzerland. on 17 December 1966.
On 2 May 1996 he was appointed Secretary of the Governatorate of Vatican City State, and on 5 May 1996 he was appointed Titular Bishop of Castello. 
He was ordained Bishop on 24 May 1996.
On 22 February he was appointed Archbishop (Personal Title) of Loreto, Italy.
He died on 2 October 2007.

References

1940 births
2007 deaths
Roman Catholic archbishops in Italy
Bishops in le Marche
Territorial prelates
20th-century Italian Roman Catholic bishops
Italian expatriates in Switzerland
People from Viggiù